James Le Gros (born April 27, 1962) is an American actor. He was nominated for the Independent Spirit Award for Best Supporting Male for his performance in Living in Oblivion.

Career
James Le Gros appeared as Rick in Gus Van Sant's 1989 Drugstore Cowboy. One of his best-known roles was in Living in Oblivion (directed by Tom DiCillo, also starring Steve Buscemi and Catherine Keener). Le Gros played Chad Palomino, an acting divo with endless "a-list" star demands for a "b-movie" director and crew. Le Gros appeared on Showtime's Sleeper Cell (as Special Agent Ray Fuller) and on Law & Order. He was also a cast member on the television series Ally McBeal and guest-starred on Roseanne, Punky Brewster, The Outer Limits, and Friends. He portrayed Dr. Dan Harris on the NBC series Mercy. Le Gros portrayed Peter Gray in the Dark Sky thriller Bitter Feast.

He is the first actor to appear on TV as Deputy United States Marshal Raylan Givens in the TV film Pronto, based on a book by Elmore Leonard. Le Gros also appeared on the TV series Justified (which centers on the character Raylan Givens) as antagonist Wade Messer.

Personal life 
Le Gros married actress and photographer Kristina Loggia, daughter of actor Robert Loggia, in 1992. They have two sons; their son Noah is also an actor.

Filmography

Film

Television

References
Notes

External links
 

American male film actors
American male television actors
Living people
University of California, Irvine alumni
20th-century American male actors
21st-century American male actors
Place of birth missing (living people)
Year of birth missing (living people)